This page lists the World Best Year Performances in the year 1988 in the Men's hammer throw. One of the main events during this season were the 1988 Summer Olympics in Seoul, South Korea, where the final of the men's competition was held on Monday September 26, 1988. Sergey Litvinov (URS) claimed the title, setting two Olympic records during the final round.

Men

Records

1988 World Year Ranking

References
digilander.libero
apulanta
hammerthrow.wz

1988
Hammer Throw Year Ranking, 1988